Abheri (pronounced ābhēri) is a raga in Carnatic music (musical scale of South Indian classical music). It is a Janya raga (derived scale), whose Melakarta raga (parent, also known as janaka) is Kharaharapriya, 22nd in the 72 Melakarta raga system.

Bhimpalasi (or Bheempalas) and Dhanashree of Hindustani music sounds close to Abheri.

Structure and Lakshana 

Abheri is an audava-sampoorna raga. Its  structure (ascending and descending scale) is as follows (see swaras in Carnatic music for details on below notation and terms):

 : 
 : 

The swaras in this scale are Chathusruthi Rishabham, Sadharana Gandharam, Suddha Madhyamam, Chathusruthi Dhaivatham and Kaisiki Nishadham.

There are some differing views on swaras in the scale of Abheri. It is considered a Bhashanga raga (scale has an anya swara, that is, a note which is not in the parent melakarta raga, in this case Kharaharapriya raga), with introduction of Suddha Dhiavatham (D1) in some phrases of the raga. A different view is that this raga is a janya of Natabhairavi (which has D1, suddha dhaivatham, in place of D2), with D2 being the anya swara (external note).

This raga is closer to Bageshri as for Bhagyasree Gandharam is sung softly. Thus a subtle difference of Gandhara makes a listener to feel this raga as Bhagyasree.

Popular compositions 
Nagumomu Ganaleni By Thyagaraja
Bhajare Manasa, Gokula Nilaya Kripalaya By Mysore Vasudevacharya
Muraliya Nadava keli, Karevaru Ba Manege By Vidyaprasanna Teertha in Kannada
Ambiga Naa Ninna Nambide, Echarike Echarike, Katiyalli Karavittano By Purandara Dasa
Pavamana Jagada Prana By Vijaya Dasa
 Angaladolu Ramanadida - (Normally sung in Bhimplasi style) one of the greatest literary works of Kanaka Dasa which tells about the Desire of little Rama
Veral Veli from Sandham: Symphony Meets Classical Tamil by Composer Rajan written by Kapilar
Vinabheri By Muthuswami Dikshitar
Eshwari Rajeshwari By Muthaiah Bhagavatar

Film Songs

Language: Tamil

Language: Kannada

Album

Popular Classical Albums on this Raagam 
An excellent rendition of this Raaga can be found in one of L. Shankar Albums Raga Aberi. He received a Grammy Nomination for this composition.

Related rāgams 
This section covers the theoretical and scientific aspect of this rāgam.

Abheri's notes when shifted using Graha bhedam, yields 3 other janya rāgams, namely, Mohanakalyani, Kedaragaula and Arabhi (if we consider the Kharaharapriya-based scale). Graha bhedam is the step taken in keeping the relative note frequencies same, while shifting the Shadjam to the next note in the rāgam. In case of Janya ragams, only notes that occur in both ascending and descending scale are taken for this change. For further details and an illustration of Graha bhedam refer Graha bhedam on Sankarabharanam. Abheri has close resemblance to Karnataka—devagandhari and Bhimpalasi. Whether they are essentially same is a matter of debate among the musicologists.

See also

List of Film Songs based on Ragas

Notes

References

Janya ragas
Janya ragas (kharaharapriya)